You're a Good Man, Charlie Brown is the 29th prime-time animated musical television special based upon the comic strip Peanuts, by Charles M. Schulz. This adaptation of the 1967 musical You're a Good Man, Charlie Brown originally aired on the CBS network on November 6, 1985, and rebroadcast on June 14, 1988. The special was produced by Charles M. Schulz Creative Associates and Mendelson-Melendez Productions.

Plot
The program opens with the other Peanuts characters singing the title song to Charlie Brown.

In the next scene, Schroeder plays Beethoven's "Moonlight Sonata" and Lucy sings along. She tries to tell him that they should get married. Schroeder ignores her, then Lucy says, "My aunt Marian was right; never try to discuss marriage with a musician."

Charlie Brown hopes for the first time to be able to keep a kite but he once again fails. Sally writes a letter to Ann Flanders about the Valentine's Day card she gets.

Charlie Brown gives Lucy a Valentine's Day card and mistakenly says, "This is for you, Lucy. Merry Christmas!" Charlie Brown sees Marcie and thinks that she is going to give him a Valentine's Day card but she does not. Lucy comes up to Schroeder again and talks about saucepans, and, again, Schroeder cannot stand it.

Snoopy imagines that he is a wild animal. Charlie Brown, Schroeder, Linus, and Lucy work on their book reports on Peter Rabbit ("Book Report"). Lucy teaches Linus about nature in her own way while Charlie Brown tries to correct her, to no avail ("Little Known Facts").

Charlie Brown writes a letter to his pencil pal about his downfall at his baseball game.  Charlie Brown pleads his baseball team to win the game by chanting "T-E-A-M" but fails. Lucy dreams of becoming a queen but gives up dreaming. Charlie Brown tries to get the Little Red-Haired Girl to know him better but fails.

Schroeder's Sing Along has songs for the play in "The Concert" by singing "Home on the Range" with his friends. And the five friends sing while Lucy, Linus, and Sally argue.  Lucy wanting her pencil back from Linus, and threatening to tell Sally what he said about her if he did not give back the pencil (Linus called Sally an enigma).  Snoopy sings a song devoted to "Suppertime" when he sees Charlie Brown serving him his supper.

In the end, Charlie Brown and all of his gang learn all about "Happiness" and why it's all around them; the special ends with Lucy telling Charlie Brown that he is a good man.

Voice cast
 Brad Kesten as Charlie Brown
 Kevin Brando as Charlie Brown (singing)
 Michael Dockery as Marcie
 Jeremy Reinbolt as Schroeder 
 Tiffany Reinbolt as Sally Brown
 Jessica Lee Smith as Lucy van Pelt
 David T. Wagner as Linus van Pelt
 Robert Towers as Snoopy (singing/speaking)
 Bill Melendez as Snoopy/Woodstock (vocal effects)
Note: Peppermint Patty, Franklin, 5, and Frieda appeared in the special but had no lines.

Home media
Warner Home Video released You're a Good Man, Charlie Brown on DVD for the first time on January 26, 2010, as a part of their Charlie Brown "Remastered Deluxe Edition" line. The DVD included a featurette entitled "Animating a Charlie Brown Musical".

References

External links

 

Peanuts television specials
Television shows directed by Sam Jaimes
1980s American television specials
1980s animated television specials
1980s American animated films
CBS original programming
1985 television specials
1985 in American television
Musical television specials
CBS television specials